Don Juan de Austria may refer to:

People:
John of Austria, ("Don Juan de Austria" or "Don John of Austria", 1547–1578) general and illegitimate son of Charles V, Holy Roman Emperor
John Joseph of Austria (1629–1679), Spanish general and political figure, illegitimate son of Philip IV of Spain
Archduke Johann of Austria (1782–1859)

Ships
Don Juan de Austria, a Spanish Navy cruiser that fought in the Battle of Manila Bay during the Spanish–American War.

The Arts
Don John of Austria, an opera by Isaac Nathan.